The R203 road is a regional road in Ireland linking Arvagh in County Cavan to Carrigallen in County Leitrim.

See also
Roads in Ireland
National primary road
National secondary road

References
Roads Act 1993 (Classification of Regional Roads) Order 2006 – Department of Transport

Regional roads in the Republic of Ireland
Roads in County Cavan
Roads in County Leitrim